Daniel or Danny Peacock may refer to:

 Daniel Peacock (born 1958), English actor
 Daniel Peacock (cricketer) (born 1975), English cricketer
 Danny Peacock (born 1968), Australian rugby footballer